Henry John Cody  (December 6, 1868 – April 27, 1951) was a Canadian clergyman and President of the University of Toronto from 1932 to 1945 and Chancellor from 1944 to 1947.

Born in Embro, Ontario, the eldest son of Elijah Cody and Margaret Louisa Torrance, he attended Galt Collegiate Institute and the University of Toronto. He was ordained a Church of England priest in 1894 and later served in Toronto at St. Paul's, Bloor Street.

Public life
He was an Ontario MPP for Toronto Northeast — Seat A from 1918 to 1920 and was Minister of Education from 1918 to 1919.

Academic life
Cody maintained a great interest in the University of Toronto throughout his life. He was a member of the Royal Commission on the University of Toronto which reported in 1906, and later was the Chairman of the Royal Commission on University Finances that reported in 1921. In 1917 he was appointed a member of the University of Toronto's board of governors, and from 1923 to 1932 served as Chairman. He would later become President of the university in 1932, and then its Chancellor in 1944.

Honours
He was made a Companion of the Order of St Michael and St George in 1943.

Cody's son, Maurice, has a K–6 school named after him in Toronto. At the University of Toronto Schools, the Cody house in the intramural house system is named in his honour.

References

Further reading

External links
 Henry John Cody at The Canadian Encyclopedia
 Zorra boys at home and abroad; or How to succeed
 
 Cody Family archival papers held at the University of Toronto Archives and Records Management Services

1868 births
1951 deaths
Canadian Anglican priests
University of Toronto alumni
Chancellors of the University of Toronto
Canadian Companions of the Order of St Michael and St George
Presidents of the University of Toronto
Progressive Conservative Party of Ontario MPPs
People from Oxford County, Ontario
Members of the Executive Council of Ontario